The neutrino theory of light is the proposal that the photon is a composite particle formed of a neutrino–antineutrino pair. It is based on the idea that emission and absorption of a photon corresponds to the creation and annihilation of a particle–antiparticle pair. The neutrino theory of light is not currently accepted as part of mainstream physics, as according to the standard model the photon is an elementary particle, a gauge boson.

History 
In the past, many particles that were once thought to be elementary such as protons, neutrons, pions, and kaons have turned out to be composite particles. In 1932, Louis de Broglie suggested that the photon might be the combination of a neutrino and an antineutrino. During the 1930s there was great interest in the neutrino theory of light and Pascual Jordan, Ralph Kronig, Max Born, and others worked on the theory.

In 1938, Maurice Henry Lecorney Pryce brought work on the composite photon theory to a halt. He showed that the conditions imposed by Bose–Einstein commutation relations for the composite photon and the connection between its spin and polarization were incompatible. Pryce also pointed out other possible problems, “In so far as the failure of the theory can be traced to any one cause it is fair to say that it lies in the fact that light waves are polarized transversely while neutrino ‘waves’ are polarized longitudinally,” and lack of rotational invariance. In 1966, V S Berezinskii reanalyzed Pryce’s paper, giving a clearer picture of the problem that Pryce uncovered.

Starting in the 1960s work on the neutrino theory of light resumed, and there continues to be some interest in recent years. Attempts have been made to solve the problem pointed out by Pryce, known as Pryce’s Theorem, and other problems with the composite photon theory. The incentive is seeing the natural way that many photon properties are generated from the theory and the knowledge that some problems exist with the current photon model. However, there is no experimental evidence that the photon has a composite structure.

Some of the problems for the neutrino theory of light are the non-existence for massless neutrinos with both spin parallel and antiparallel to their momentum and the fact that composite photons are not bosons. Attempts to solve some of these problems will be discussed, but the lack of massless neutrinos makes it impossible to form a massless photon with this theory. The neutrino theory of light is not considered to be part of mainstream physics.

Forming photon from neutrinos
It is possible to obtain transversely polarized
photons from neutrinos.

The neutrino field
The neutrino field satisfies the Dirac equation with the mass set to zero,

The gamma matrices in the Weyl basis are:

The matrix  is Hermitian while  is antihermitian. They satisfy the anticommutation relation,

The neutrino field is given by,

The 's are spinors with the superscripts and subscripts referring to the energy and helicity states respectively. Spinor solutions for the Dirac equation are,

The neutrino spinors for negative momenta are related to those of positive momenta by,

The composite photon field
De Broglie and Kronig suggested the use of a local interaction to bind the neutrino–antineutrino pair. (Rosen and Singer
have used a delta potential interaction in forming a composite photon.)
Fermi and Yang
used a local interaction to bind
a fermion–antiferminon pair in attempting to form a pion. A four-vector field can be created from a fermion–antifermion pair,

Forming the photon field can be done simply by,

where .

The annihilation operators for right-handed and left-handed photons formed of fermion–antifermion pairs are defined as,

 is a spectral function, normalized by

Photon polarization vectors
The polarization vectors corresponding to the combinations used
in Eq. (1) are,

Carrying out the matrix multiplications results in,

where  and  have been placed on the right.

For massless fermions the polarization vectors depend only upon the direction of
. Let .

These polarization vectors satisfy the
normalization relation,

The Lorentz-invariant dot
products of the internal four-momentum 
with the polarization vectors are,

In three dimensions,

Composite photon satisfies Maxwell’s equations
In terms of the polarization vectors,  becomes,

The electric field  and magnetic field
 are given by,

Applying Eq. (6) to Eq. (5), results in,

Maxwell's equations for free space are obtained as follows:

Thus,  contains terms of the form
 which equate to zero by the first of Eq. (4).
This gives,

as  contains similar terms.

The expression  contains terms of the form
 while

contains terms of form . Thus, the last two equations of (4) can be used to show that,

Although the neutrino field violates parity and charge
conjugation
,
 and
 transform in the usual way
,

 satisfies the Lorenz condition,

which follows from Eq. (3).

Although many choices for gamma matrices can satisfy the Dirac equation, it
Kronig
first realized this. In the Weyl representation,
the four-component spinors are describing two sets of two-component neutrinos.
The connection between the photon antisymmetric tensor and the two-component Weyl equation was also noted by Sen.
One can also produce the above results using a two-component neutrino theory.

To compute the commutation relations for the photon field,
one needs the equation,

To obtain this equation, Kronig
wrote a relation between the neutrino spinors that was not
rotationally invariant as pointed out by Pryce.
However, as Perkins showed, this equation
follows directly from summing over the polarization vectors,
Eq. (2), that were obtained by
explicitly solving for the neutrino spinors.

If the momentum is along the third axis, 
and  reduce to the usual polarization vectors
for right and left circularly polarized photons respectively.

Problems with the neutrino theory of light
Although composite photons satisfy many properties of real photons,
there are major problems with this theory.

Bose–Einstein commutation relations
It is known that a photon is a boson.
Does the composite photon satisfy Bose–Einstein commutation relations? Fermions are defined as the particles whose creation and annihilation operators  adhere to the anticommutation relations

while bosons are defined as the particles that adhere to the commutation relations

The creation and annihilation operators of composite particles formed of fermion pairs adhere to the commutation relations of the form

with

For Cooper electron pairs, "a" and "c" represent different spin directions. For nucleon pairs (the deuteron), "a" and "c" represent proton and neutron. For neutrino–antineutrino pairs, "a" and "c" represent neutrino and antineutrino. The size of the deviations from pure Bose behavior,

depends on the degree of overlap of the fermion wave functions and the constraints of the Pauli exclusion principle.

If the state has the form

then the expectation value of Eq.
 can be approximated by

showing that it is the average number
of fermions in a particular state  averaged

Jordan’s attempt to solve problem

De Broglie did not address the problem of statistics for the composite photon. However, "Jordan considered the essential part of the problem was to construct Bose–Einstein amplitudes from Fermi–Dirac amplitudes", as Pryce noted. Jordan "suggested that it is not the interaction between neutrinos and antineutrinos that binds them together into photons, but rather the manner in which they interact with charged particles that leads to the simplified description of light in terms of photons."

Jordan's hypothesis eliminated the need for theorizing an unknown interaction, but his hypothesis that the neutrino and antineutrino are emitted in exactly the same direction seems rather artificial as noted by Fock.
His strong desire to obtain exact Bose–Einstein commutation relations for the composite photon led him to work with a scalar or longitudinally polarized photon.  Greenberg and Wightman
have pointed out why the one-dimensional case works, but the three-dimensional case does not.

In 1928, Jordan noticed that commutation relations for
pairs of fermions were similar to those for bosons.
Compare Eq. (7) with Eq. (8).
From 1935 till 1937, Jordan, Kronig, and others
tried to obtain exact Bose–Einstein commutation relations for the composite photon. Terms were added to the commutation relations to cancel out the delta term in Eq. (8). These terms corresponded to "simulated photons". For example, the absorption of a photon of momentum  could be simulated by a Raman effect in which a neutrino with momentum  is absorbed while another of another with opposite spin and momentum  is emitted. (It is now known that single neutrinos or antineutrinos interact so weakly that they cannot simulate photons.)

Pryce’s theorem
In 1938, Pryce showed that one cannot obtain both Bose–Einstein statistics and transversely polarized photons from neutrino–antineutrino pairs. Construction of transversely polarized photons is not the problem.
As Berezinski
noted, "The only actual difficulty is that the construction of a transverse
four-vector is incompatible with the requirement of statistics."
In some ways Berezinski gives a clearer picture of the
problem. A simple version of the proof is as follows:

The expectation values of the commutation relations for composite
right and left-handed photons are:

where

, which are functions of the neutrino numbers operators.

Linear polarization photon operators are defined by

A particularly interesting commutation relation is,

which follows from (10) and (12).

For the composite photon to obey Bose–Einstein commutation relations, at the very least,

Pryce noted.
From Eq. (11) and Eq. (13)  the
requirement is that

gives zero when applied to any state vector. Thus, all the coefficients of
etc. must vanish separately. This means ,
and the composite photon does not exist, completing the proof.

Perkins’ attempt to solve problem
Perkins
reasoned that the photon does
not have to obey Bose–Einstein commutation relations, because the non-Bose
terms are small and they may not cause any detectable effects.
Perkins
noted, "As presented in many quantum mechanics
texts it may appear that Bose statistics follow from basic principles, but it is really from the classical canonical formalism. This is not a reliable procedure as evidenced by the fact that it gives the completely wrong result for spin-1/2 particles." Furthermore,
"most integral spin particles (light mesons, strange mesons, etc.) are composite particles formed of quarks. Because of their underlying fermion structure, these integral spin particles are not fundamental bosons, but composite quasibosons. However, in the asymptotic limit, which generally applies, they are essentially bosons. For these particles, Bose commutation relations are just an approximation, albeit a very good one. There are some differences; bringing two of these composite particles close together will force their identical fermions to jump to excited states because of the Pauli exclusion principle."

Brzezinski in reaffirming Pryce's theorem argues
that commutation relation (14) is necessary for the
photon to be truly neutral. However, Perkins
has shown that a neutral photon in the usual sense can be
obtained without Bose–Einstein commutation relations.

The number operator for a composite photon is defined as

Lipkin
suggested for a rough estimate to assume
that 
where  is a constant equal
to the number of states used to construct the wave packet.

Perkins
showed that the effect
of the composite photon’s
number operator acting on a state of  composite photons is,

using .
This result differs from the usual
one because of the second term which is small for large .
Normalizing in the
usual manner,

where  is the state of 
composite photons having momentum  which is created
by applying   on the vacuum  times.
Note that,

which is the same result as obtained
with boson operators.  The formulas in Eq. (15)
are similar to the usual ones with correction factors
that approach zero for large .

Blackbody radiation
The main evidence indicating that photons are bosons comes from the Blackbody radiation experiments which are in agreement with Planck's distribution. Perkins calculated the photon distribution for Blackbody radiation using the second quantization method, but with a composite photon.

The atoms in the walls of the cavity are taken to be a two-level system with photons emitted from the upper level β and absorbed at the lower level α. The transition probability for emission of a photon is enhanced when np photons are present,

where the first of (15) has been used. The absorption is enhanced less since the second of (15) is used,

Using the equality,

of the transition rates, Eqs. (16) and (17) are combined to give,

The probability of finding the system with energy E is proportional to e−E/kT according to Boltzmann's distribution law. Thus, the equilibrium between emission and absorption requires that,

with the photon energy . Combining the last two equations results in,

For , this reduces to

This equation differs from Planck’s law because of the   term.

Only left-handed neutrinos exist
Experimental results show that only left-handed neutrinos
and right-handed antineutrinos exist. Three sets of neutrinos
have been observed, one
that is connected with electrons, one
with muons, and one with tau leptons.

In the standard model the pion and muon decay modes are:
{|
| || → ||  || + || 
|----
| || → ||  || + ||  || + || 
|}

To form a photon, which satisfies parity and charge conjugation, two sets of two-component neutrinos (i.e., right-handed and left-handed neutrinos) are needed. Perkins (see Sec. VI of Ref.) attempted to solve this problem by noting that the needed two sets of two-component neutrinos would exist if the positive muon is identified as the particle and the negative muon as the antiparticle. The reasoning is as follows: let 1 be the right-handed neutrino and 2 the left-handed neutrino with their corresponding antineutrinos (with opposite helicity). The neutrinos involved in beta decay are 2 and 2, while those for π–μ decay are 1 and 1. With this scheme the pion and muon decay modes are:
{|
| || → ||  || + || 1
|----
| || → ||  || + || 2 || + || 1
|}

Absence of massless neutrinos
There is convincing evidence that neutrinos have mass. In experiments at the SuperKamiokande researchers have discovered neutrino oscillations in which one flavor of neutrino changed into another. This means that neutrinos have non-zero mass. Since massless neutrinos are needed to form a massless photon, a composite photon is not possible.

References

External links
L. de Broglie "A new conception of light" (English translation)

Light
Obsolete theories in physics